Colbert Coldwell (sometimes reported as Caldwell; May 16, 1822 – April 18, 1892) was a justice of the Supreme Court of Texas from September 1867 to October 1869.

His grandson, also named Colbert Coldwell, founded Coldwell Banker.

References

Justices of the Texas Supreme Court
1822 births
1892 deaths
19th-century American judges